This page primarily is meant to list non-video game designers. Please see list of computer and video game industry people for a list of well-known video game designers.

A game designer is a person who invents games at the conceptual level. Most game designers are "unsung"; for example, no one knows who invented Chess or Hearts.

However, there are many public figures in game design, including commercial game developers and game-inventing mathematicians.

Some game designers include:

Role-playing games designers
Salem Alanzi
 Dave Arneson - Co-designer of Dungeons and Dragons, an early influential role-playing game
 Frank Chadwick - Co-founder of Game Designers' Workshop (GDW) and designer of over 50 war and role-playing games, including Twilight 2000 and the Assault series
 Troy Christensen - Designer of Phantasm Adventures, a 1980s role-playing game published in Japanese and English
John Horton Conway
Monte Cook
 Jim Dunnigan - Founder of SPI Games and designer of over 100 wargames, including the PanzerBlitz/Panzer Leader system
 James Ernest - president and lead game designer for Cheapass Games
 Richard Garfield - collectible card game (Magic: The Gathering) and board game designer
Andrew Greenberg
Ed Greenwood
Gary Gygax - Co-designer of Dungeons and Dragons, an early influential role-playing game
Larry Harris
Stieg Hedlund - Started out in pen-and-paper games before moving on to electronic games
Steve Jackson (UK)
Jeff Kinney 
Albert Lamorisse
Andrew Looney
Marc Miller Co-founder of GDW and designer / writer of Traveller and several board games
Mark Rein-Hagen
Mike Selinker
C.A. Suleiman
Jonathan Tweet
Michael J. Varhola
Mark H. Walker
Jordan Weisman
Tom Wham
Skip Williams

Word game designers
Erik Agard
Will Shortz

Board game designers

 William Attia (Caylus, Caylus Magna Carta)
 Alfred Butts (Scrabble)
 Milton Bradley (The Checkered Game of Life), founder of Milton Bradley Company
 Inka Brand (Rajas of the Ganges, Village, Exit Series)
 Markus Brand (Rajas of the Ganges, Village, Exit Series)
 Richard Breese (Aladdin's Dragons, Keythedral, Reef Encounter)
 Kris Burm (Batik, GIPF, ZÈRTZ, DVONN, TAMSK, YINSH, PÜNCT)
 Allan B. Calhamer (Diplomacy)
 Leo Colovini (Clans, Carolus Magnus, Cartagena, Doge, The Bridges of Shangri-La, Magna Grecia, Inkognito)
 Julian Courtland-Smith (Escape from Atlantis)
 Franz-Benno Delonge (Big City, Manila, Dos Rios, TransAmerica, Fjords)
 Rudiger Dorn (The Traders of Genoa, Louis XIV, Goa)
 Stefan Dorra (For Sale, Pick Picnic, Medina, Tonga Bonga, Linie 1, Turn the Tide, Intrige)
 Bruno Faidutti (Citadels, Mystery of the Abbey, Terra)
 Friedemann Friese (Power Grid, Fearsome Floors, Fresh Fish)
 Mac Gerdts (Imperial, Antike)
 Paul J. Gruen
 Elizabeth Hargrave (Wingspan)
 Dirk Henn (Alhambra, Atlantic Star, Metro, Wallenstein, Timbuktu)
 Steve Jackson  (Ogre, The Fantasy Trip, Car Wars, GURPS, Hacker, Illuminati)
 Philippe Keyaerts (Evo, Vinci)
 Michael Kiesling (Azul, Heaven & Ale, Tikal, Vikings)
 Reiner Knizia (Ra, Modern Art, Tigris and Euphrates, Samurai, Lost Cities, Schotten Totten, Blue Moon, The Lord of the Rings)
 Wolfgang Kramer (El Grande, Java, Mexica, Tikal, Princes of Florence, Torres)
 Alan R. Moon (Capitol, Elfenland, Union Pacific, Ticket to Ride)
 Christian T. Petersen (Twilight Imperium, A Game of Thrones (board game), World of Warcraft (board game))
 Paul Randles (Pirate's Cove, Key Largo)
 Alex Randolph (Twixt, Raj, Geister, Enchanted Forest, Inkognito, Ricochet Robots)
 Ken Rolston, part of the core team at West End Games
 Charles S. Roberts (Tactics II (first commercial board wargame)), founder of Avalon Hill
 Uwe Rosenberg (Agricola, Bohnanza)
 Sid Sackson (Acquire, Can't Stop, Kohle, Kies & Knete)
 Michael Schacht (Web of Power, Dschunke, Industria, Hansa)
 Andreas Schmidt (Heaven & Ale)
 Karl-Heinz Schmiel (Attila, Die Macher)
 Emiliano Sciarra (Bang!)
 Andreas Seyfarth (Manhattan, Puerto Rico)
 Daniel Stahl (Pirate's Cove)
 Vital Lacerda (Vinhos, Kanban EV, CO2: Second Chance, The Gallerist)
 Gertrude Strohm ("Popping the Question"; "Novel Fortune Telling")
 Jerry Taylor (Hammer of the Scots, Crusader Rex)
 Klaus Teuber (The Settlers of Catan, Adel Verpflichtet, Entdecker, Löwenherz)
 Martin Wallace (Liberte, Age of Steam, Struggle of Empires, Princes of the Renaissance)
 Klaus-Jürgen Wrede (Carcassonne)

See also
 List of video game designers

Game designers